The Tuts were an English DIY pop punk, "three-tone" band from Hayes, Greater London. They received extensive coverage from alternative music radio, most notably Amazing Radio, and from music websites such as Louder Than War who published multiple articles on the group, calling them "one of the UK's most exciting bands". The band, particularly frontwoman Nadia Javed, were the subject of a feature in the ITV series Young, British and Muslim in April 2018.

Initially influenced by contemporary indie and alternative rock, their back-to-basics sound and feminist politics led to comparisons with older genres such as punk, C86 and riot grrrl.

By 2022, Javed had become a solo artist.

Origins
The Tuts were formed by teenagers Nadia Javed (guitar) and Beverley Ishmael (drums) in the mid-2000s while still at school. The bass guitarist, Harriet Doveton (also of Colour Me Wednesday), joined in late 2010 and this line up played its first gig in early 2011.

The band self-released their first EP, The Tuts, in 2012, and the download single "Tut Tut Tut" early the following year, picking up radio support from Billy Reeves, Gary Crowley, Ruth Barnes, Steve Lamacq and Gideon Coe.

A 2013 tour with Kate Nash led to a track on Nash's Have Faith This Christmas EP later that year; the band also made their first appearance at Indietracks, and released two more download singles, "Dump Your Boyfriend" and "Worry Warrior", the artwork for the latter a playful nod to X Ray Spex.

In 2014, the band released a second EP, Time to Move On, and played on the Leftfield stage at Glastonbury Festival at the invitation of Billy Bragg.

In 2015, they launched their single 'Do I Have to Look For Love?' and toured with The Selecter and Sonic Boom Six, returned to Indietracks and appeared at the Tolpuddle Martyrs festival.

Album and after
Having built a fanbase solely through touring and DIY/social media promotion, in spring 2016 The Tuts started a PledgeMusic campaign to finance their debut album. It reached its target within a week.

The band's album Update Your Brain was released in September 2016 to universally-positive reviews, including national press.

In July, they had released a new download single, "Let Go of the Past", with an accompanying video. Their video to follow-up single "1982" was premiered on Vice magazine's Noisey channel in October 2016.

In September 2016, they embarked on an album release tour, including a sold out show at The Lexington, London and a run of dates co-headlining with anti-folk Manchester based band Crywank.
The same year the band played with The Undertones, Thee Faction, Adam Ant and Senseless Things and performed at several summer festivals in 2016, including Bearded Theory, Glastonwick, Camden Rocks, Indiefjord, Godiva and Rebellion. In 2017 The Tuts supported Feeder, toured with The Skints, and played the Bestival and Indietracks festivals.

In May and June 2017, The Tuts embarked on their own "Give Us Something Worth Voting For" tour, with reference to the impending UK general election and their eponymous anti-Conservative album track. Later the same year the band collaborated with Girli on a new version of the song "Mr 10pm Bedtime", previously released on her Hot Mess EP.

Javed and the band received TV coverage as part of the ITV series Young British and Muslim in April 2018. The feature contained interview footage of Javed on life as a young female Muslim musician in Britain as well as rehearsal footage of the full band.

In March 2019, the band announced that they would be supporting The Specials on their Encore tour.

In June 2019, The Tuts supported Bikini Kill at O2 Academy Brixton alongside Big Joanie

In December 2019 Javed launched a live version of her song 'I Hate Boris' on YouTube  ahead of the general election.

In 2020 the band's debut album Update Your Brain featured in James Acaster's book and (with comedian Suzi Ruffell) podcast Perfect Sound, Whatever as one of his favourite albums of 2016.

Breakup
After a lengthy silence from the band, Javed re-emerged as a solo artist in 2022, playing the Godiva Festival.

Controversies
A dispute arose between the band and management of the Undercover Festival in 2016, following clashes between security staff and band members, during the performance of the headline act The Selecter. 

The band cited, as a precedent for the above, an incident in 2012 The Windmill, Brixton where Javed (and eyewitnesses) reported an assault on her by staff. Police were called but no further action was taken. There was no CCTV footage. The promoter, who had not been present but had discussed the incident with the staff involved, released a statement.

In January 2019, The Tuts claimed to have turned down the opportunity to represent the UK at the Eurovision Song Contest 2019 due to it being held in Israel. The band was not mentioned in the shortlist for the preliminary contest for UK entry, Eurovision: You Decide, which preceded the competition in February.

In July 2019, it emerged that Javed is one of several musicians being sued by the singer/rapper Jonny "Itch" Fox, seeking aggravated damages and an injunction for alleged libel. The defendants were fundraising towards their legal costs.

Members
Nadia Javed – guitar, vocals (2007-2019)
Beverley Ishmael – drums (2007–2019)
Harriet Doveton – bass, vocals (2010–2019)

Timeline

Discography

Album
Update Your Brain Dovetown, LP/CD/DD, 2016

Singles/EPs
The Tuts EP CD/DD, 2012
"Tut Tut Tut" DD, 2013
"Dump Your Boyfriend" DD, 2013
"Worry Warrior" DD, 2013
"Christmas Is In The Air" DD, 2013
Time to Move On EP CD/DD, 2014
"Do I Have To Look For Love" DD, 2015
"Let Go of the Past" DD, 2016
"1982" DD, 2016
"Do I Have To Look For Love"/"Lying Lover" 7"/DD, 2017
"Mr 10pm Bedtime" (Girli vs. The Tuts) DD, 2017

Compilation appearances
"I Call You Up" on MC12, HHBTM Records, Cassette, 2012
"Do I Have To Look For Love" on Don't Be Left Without Us, 2CD, 2016

References

External links
Bandcamp
2015 Rookie interview
2015 Indietracks interview
2016 Louder Than War interview
2016 Digital Fix interview 
2016 Bristol Live interview

All-female punk bands
Feminist musicians
English punk rock groups
English indie rock groups
British indie pop groups
Riot grrrl bands
British musical trios